Scissurella cyprina, common name the Venus slit shell, is a species of minute sea snail, a marine gastropod mollusk or micromollusk in the family Scissurellidae, the little slit snails.

Description
The shell grows to a height of 2 mm.

Distribution
This marine species occurs off New South Wales, South Australia and Western Australia; off Tasmania.

References

 Cotton, B. C. (1959). South Australian Mollusca. Archaeogastropoda. Adelaide, W.L. Hawes. 449 pp., 1 pl.
 Wilson, B. (1993). Australian Marine Shells. Prosobranch Gastropods. Kallaroo, WA : Odyssey Publishing. Vol.1 1st Edn
 Jansen, P., 1999. The Australian Scissurellidae. Conchiglia, 31(291):47-55

External links
 To Encyclopedia of Life
 To World Register of Marine Species
 

Scissurellidae
Gastropods described in 1938